Norman Ray Bridwell (February 15, 1928 – December 12, 2014) was an American author and cartoonist best known for the Clifford the Big Red Dog book series.

Early life
Bridwell was born on February 15, 1928, in Kokomo, Indiana, to Leona and Vern Bridwell. He graduated from Kokomo High School in 1945, and went on to attend John Herron School of Art at Indiana University – Purdue University Indianapolis, and Cooper Union, in New York City.

Career

Bridwell put together a portfolio and attempted to get a job as a children's book illustrator but was rejected by approximately fifteen publishing houses. While at Harper & Row, an editor offhandedly suggested he turn one of his drawings into a story. The drawing was of a young girl and a horse-sized bloodhound, and the story became Clifford the Big Red Dog. That book spawned over 40 best-selling Clifford books, three animated television series, merchandise, a live musical, and a live-action film. Clifford serves as the official mascot of Scholastic, the publisher of the series.

Bridwell's other successful books include The Witch Next Door, How to Care for Your Monster, and A Tiny Family. There are over 126 million copies of his books in print in 13 languages.

Personal life
In 1958, Bridwell was married to his wife Norma Ellen Howard. They had a daughter Emily Elizabeth Merz and a son named Tim. At the time of his death, they had three grandchildren.

The Bridwells resided in Edgartown, Massachusetts on Martha's Vineyard, from 1969 until his death.

Death
Bridwell died on December 12, 2014, at the age of 86 from prostate cancer; Norman's wife, Norma stated he had been in the hospital for three weeks before his death after a fall at his home. His funeral was held at the Federated Church on South Summer street in Edgartown. He was cremated, and his ashes were given to his son, Tim.

References

External links

 
 

1928 births
2014 deaths
American children's writers
American children's book illustrators
Clifford the Big Red Dog
Cooper Union alumni
Deaths from prostate cancer
Herron School of Art and Design alumni
People from Edgartown, Massachusetts
People from Kokomo, Indiana
Writers from Indiana